Benjamina Karić (born 8 April 1991) is a Bosnian politician serving as the 39th mayor of Sarajevo since April 2021. She has been a member of the Social Democratic Party since 2009.

Karić was born in Sarajevo in 1991. She graduated from the University of Sarajevo. She later worked as an assistant at the Faculty of Law at the University of Travnik and in Kiseljak. Following the 2020 municipal elections, Karić became mayor of Sarajevo in 2021 as a replacement for Bogić Bogićević, who decided to pull out of the candidacy for mayor shortly before.

Early life and education
Karić was born on 8 April 1991 in Sarajevo, SR Bosnia and Herzegovina, SFR Yugoslavia. She graduated from two faculties at the same time, the Faculty of Law, University of Sarajevo and the Department of History of the Faculty of Philosophy in Sarajevo.

Karić is a recipient of the Silver Badge of the University of Sarajevo for Outstanding Achievement in Undergraduate and Postgraduate Studies. She is an author of fifty publications, books, articles and translations from Latin to Bosnian.

In 2014, she was an assistant at the Faculty of Law, University of Travnik and in Kiseljak.

Karić joined the Social Democratic Party at the age of 18 in 2009, becoming the party's vice president ten years later, in 2019.

Mayor of Sarajevo (2021–present)

Following the 2020 Bosnian municipal elections, Bogić Bogićević, former member of the Presidency of Yugoslavia in the late 1980s and early 1990s, announced that he would accept the appointment as mayor of Sarajevo by the four-party liberal coalition set to govern the City Council after the elections, which includes the Social Democratic Party (SDP BiH). However, on 24 March 2021, he decided to pull out of the candidacy because of conflicts in the coalition. This set the stage for Karić, with the SDP BiH announcing that she would be the new candidate for the office of mayor on 5 April 2021.

Three days later on 8 April, Karić was unanimously elected by members of the City Council of Sarajevo to become the 39th mayor of the city, replacing Abdulah Skaka, becoming the second female in that office (the first being Semiha Borovac from 2005 to 2009). Upon her election, the mayor of Istanbul Ekrem İmamoğlu congratulated Karić for her appointment as mayor, sending her his best wishes.

On 4 May 2021, she met with Austrian Foreign Minister Alexander Schallenberg in Sarajevo, upon his visit to Bosnia and Herzegovina.

In June 2021, Karić visited the northwestern Bosnian city of Banja Luka, where she met with its mayor Draško Stanivuković, marking this event the first time after 26 years, and since the end of the Bosnian War, that the mayors of both Sarajevo and Banja Luka, as the two largest cities of Bosnia and Herzegovina, have met each other. Later during that same month, Karić and Istočno Sarajevo mayor Ljubiša Ćosić signed a memorandum on the construction of a bike path, planned to connect Sarajevo and the town of Pale. On 30 June, the city's authorities launched a project to rebuild the astronomical observatory located on the mountain Trebević. On 8 July 2021, she visited Istanbul and there met with its mayor Ekrem İmamoğlu. On 17 July, the eve of her 100th day in office, Karić revealed plans for constructions of a large urban park, bike paths and excursion sites.

On 12 November 2021, the Sarajevo City Administration put up a monument in Kazani, honoring ethnic Serbs living inside besieged Sarajevo, who were victims of a mass murder by the forces of Mušan Topalović, commander of the 10th Mountain Brigade in the Army of the Republic of Bosnia and Herzegovina during the Bosnian War. On 15 November, Karić and High Representative Christian Schmidt unveiled the monument. UDIK, which was one of initiators of the monument, and families of the victims did not attend the unveiling after it was revealed that the perpetrators' names would be omitted from the plaque.

Personal life
Karić is married and has one child. She lives with her family in Sarajevo.

She is fluent in English and German.

References

Sources

External links

Benjamina Karić at Facebook

1991 births
Living people
Politicians from Sarajevo
Academic staff of the University of Sarajevo
21st-century women politicians
Politicians of the Federation of Bosnia and Herzegovina
Social Democratic Party of Bosnia and Herzegovina politicians
Mayors of Sarajevo
Women mayors of places in Bosnia and Herzegovina